Bridge over Troubled Dreams is the seventh studio album by Australian singer-songwriter Delta Goodrem. It was released on 14 May 2021 and serves as Goodrem's first album of all-new material since 2016's Wings of the Wild. The album will be promoted with a series of concert dates throughout Australia and New Zealand on the Bridge over Troubled Dreams Tour, originally planned for April and May 2021 but postponed until September and October 2021. It was then postponed again till 2022. She cancelled the New Zealand leg due to Covid-19 in March 2022. The album was released alongside an autobiographical book.

The album was preceded by the singles "Keep Climbing", "Paralyzed", "Solid Gold" , "Billionaire" and "All of My Friends".

The album debuted at number one in Australia, becoming Goodrem's fifth number-one album. In doing so, Goodrem now draws equal second with Kasey Chambers for most number ones on the ARIA Albums Chart by a local female solo artist, with Kylie Minogue (with seven) having the most.

Background
Planning for Bridge over Troubled Dreams can be seen to have originally dated back to 2018 with the release of "Think About You". The song indicated a change in sound and direction for Goodrem. However, Goodrem has since explained that she later opted for a return to the piano-based ballad pop of her debut album, Innocent Eyes, stating that she had "not tried to chase a sound and this album and body of work is me being my authentic self musically. In creating this album, I wanted to hear all the songs with live musicians. Every song I started at the piano. Every instrument is recorded live and there is a cohesive sound that has been captured".

In December 2019, Goodrem announced she was "living in a music bubble", working on her then-sixth studio album, and officially marked the beginning of the new era with the release of "Keep Climbing", serving as the lead single for her seventh album. The song was globally premiered as part of Goodrem's seventh instalment of The Bunkerdown Sessions which she had carried out weekly within lockdown. A motivational piano ballad, Goodrem explained that her intention behind the song was to remind people to not be afraid to find the strength when they feel stuck between where they are and where they want to go”.

On 17 July 2020, Goodrem released the album's second official single, "Paralyzed". Lyrically, Goodrem explained the song to be a "narrative of when your whole world stops and has to be reset"; and described the album upon the release of "Paralyzed" to be "a nod to [my old stuff] sonically speaking in terms of what I was listening to, and getting re-inspired by", further adding "I needed to kind of go back to what I used to do. I had to give myself the freedom to be a little eccentric again. With some of the other songs on the new record, I definitely allowed myself to change tempos; to not have a structure. And at the same time, to have hopefully enough catchiness for somebody to still grab hold of it. There's definitely still both sides of the coin."

In an interview with Grazia, Goodrem referred to the album as her "first 'woman' record", further explaining "my next album has really been about being transparent and finding that part of me that wants to be my authentic self at all times. The album is incredibly personal, raw and honest. I have opened up and shared stories that I have not shared before and people have really resonated to the transparency and vulnerability. I just want to make good music for people to have as soundtracks to their own lives." Delta went onto say inspiration for the album came from  the concept of "home" and wanting to be more literal. She was also inspired by a photograph of Patti Smith.

Planned for release in 2020 as her sixth studio album, Goodrem then released Christmas album Only Santa Knows in November of that year with no prior announcement.
Four months after the release of Only Santa Knows, Goodrem revealed that Bridge over Troubled Dreams would be released on 14 May 2021. The six-month gap between the release of the two albums marks the shortest time between albums of Goodrem's career.

Critical reception

In a positive review of the album, Retro Pop Magazine described the album as Goodrem's "most accomplished effort yet", and "a collection of tracks that look inward and share her most personal stories with the world"; highlighting "Everyone's Famous" as "an exploration of the nature of fame and the challenges it presents" and the "musings on the impact of success on close relationships" of "All of My Friends".

David from auspOp said "It's rare for an artist to let you in so deeply on each song and is a testament to how transparent she's being this album. It's all Delta and it's stunning".

Stack noted that Bridge over Troubled Dreams "successfully veer[s] from pop to ballads, gospel and even a country-tinged detour", and that the album's themes include "fame, fear and failing to live up to expectations".

Commercial performance
Bridge over Troubled Dreams debuted on the Australian ARIA Album Chart at number-one; her fifth to do so and the eighth by an Australian artist in 2021. In its second charting week, the album dropped to number-nine; and rose to number-eight in its third.

In the UK, the album debuted at twenty-five on the UK Album Downloads Chart, rising to twenty-two in its second week.

The album was also supported by an National tour of Australia in March/April 2022, with a New Zealand leg being cancelled due to covid restrictions. She took the tour to Europe for shows in the UK and Germany in October 2022.

Track listing
All tracks are produced by Delta Goodrem, Mark Rankin, and Matthew Copley, except "The Power", produced by Goodrem and Copley.

Personnel

Musicians

 Delta Goodrem – lead vocals, piano (all tracks); background vocals (3, 4, 6, 11), writer (all), concept
 Matthew Copley – guitar (1–6, 8–11), background vocals (3, 4, 6, 11); bass guitar, percussion (11), writer(1, 3, 5, 8, 10, 11), concept
 Marla Altschuler – background vocals (3, 4, 6), writer (2-6, 8-10), concept 
 Ian Burdge – cello (1, 2, 4, 5, 7–11)
 The Trilogy Group – choir vocals (1, 3, 5, 8–10)
 Tony Jones – choir vocals (1, 3, 5, 8–10)
 Aaron Sterling – drums (1–4, 6, 8)
 Sally Herbert – strings (1, 2, 4, 5, 7, 10), violin (1, 2, 4, 7, 10)
 Sean Hurley – bass guitar (2–6)
 Sister 2 Sister School of Singing – choir vocals (2–4)
 Matt Chamberlain – drums (5, 9)
 Rachel Robson – viola (5, 6, 8, 9, 11)
 Calina de la Mare – violin (5, 6, 8, 9, 11)
 Julia Singleton – violin (5, 6, 8, 9, 11)
 Richard George – violin (5, 6, 8, 9, 11)
 Tom Pigott Smith – violin (5, 6, 8, 9, 11)
 Luke Davison – drums (10)
 Amy Wadge - writer (7) 
 Sebastion Cole - writer (1)
 DNA Songs - writer (11)
 Vince Pizzinga- writer (11)
 Audius Mtawarira - writer (11) 
 Alan Watts - writer / sample (11)

Technical

 Leon Zervos – mastering engineer
 Mark Rankin – mixing engineer (1–9, 11)
 Miles Walker – mixing engineer (10)
 Tom Garnett – recording engineer (6, 8–11)
 Lewis Mitchell – recording engineer (3, 5)
 Wesley Seidman – assistant engineer (1–7)

Charts

Weekly charts

Year-end charts

References

2021 albums
Delta Goodrem albums